Breadstone is a village and former civil parish, now in the parish of Hamfallow, in the Stroud district, in the county of Gloucestershire, England. In 1931 the parish had a population of 95.

Governance 
Breadstone was formerly a tything in Berkeley parish, from 1866 Breadstone was a civil parish in its own right until it was abolished on 1 April 1935 and merged with Hamfallow.

References

External links

Villages in Gloucestershire
Former civil parishes in Gloucestershire
Stroud District